Dorytomus tortrix is a species of weevil native to Europe.

References

External links

Curculionidae
Beetles described in 1761
Beetles of Europe
Taxa named by Carl Linnaeus